A talking point, often used in the plural, is a pre-established message or formula used in the field of political communication, sales and commercial or advertising communication. The message is coordinated a priori to remain more or less invariable regardless of which stakeholder brings the message in the media.  Such statements can either be free standing or created as retorts to the opposition's talking points and are frequently used in public relations, particularly in areas heavy in debate such as politics and marketing.

See also
Factoid
Fact sheet
Framing (social sciences)

References

Rhetoric
Election campaign terminology
Propaganda techniques using words